North Binyang Cave is cave number 104 at the Longmen Grottoes near Luoyang, Henan, China.

History
Initiated by order of Emperor Xuanwu of the Northern Wei in honour of his parents Emperor Xiaowen and Empress Wenzhao, the cave was not completed until the Tang.

Features
The main image is an Amitabha with a patterned halo.  Dragon-head shaped column bases dating from the Northern Wei flank the cave entrance.  Other figures are also present (possibly bodhisattvas).

Nearby caves
Middle Binyang Cave and South Binyang Cave are adjacent to the south.

Images

Chinese Buddhist grottoes
Chinese architectural history
Archaeological sites in China
Chinese sculpture
Caves of Henan
Tourist attractions in Henan
Religion in Henan